Pallodes is a genus of sap-feeding beetles in the family Nitidulidae. There are at least three described species in Pallodes.

Species
These three species belong to the genus Pallodes.
 Pallodes austrinus Leschen, 1988
 Pallodes pallidus (Beauvois, 1805)
 Pallodes plateosus Schaeffer, 1931

References

Further reading

 
 
 
 
 

Nitidulidae